Alupakusadi Lucas Gonahasa was an Anglican bishop who served in Uganda. he was the assistant bishop of Bukedi from 1978 to 1983; and assistant bishop of Kampala from 1983 to 1997 

Gonahasa was educated at Buwalasi Theological College. He served the Bishop of the Upper Nile from 1958 to 1960; of Ankole-Kigezi from 1960 to 1967; and was a Senior Chaplain to the Forces from 1967 to 1977.

He died in 2008.

References 

20th-century Anglican bishops in Uganda
Anglican bishops of Kampala
Bulwalasi Theological College alumni
Ugandan military chaplains